This is a list of the Mayors and Lord Mayors of the City of Brisbane, a local government area of Queensland, Australia. The current Lord Mayor of Brisbane is Adrian Schrinner.

Mayors of the Brisbane Municipal Council (1859–1903) 
The Town of Brisbane, established in 1859, was led by a mayor.

Mayors of the Brisbane City Council (1903–1925) 
The City of Brisbane, established in 1903, replaced the Town of Brisbane and was led by a mayor.

Lord Mayors of the Brisbane City Council (1925–present) 
The new City of Brisbane, established in 1925, replaced the former City of Brisbane and is led by the Lord Mayor.

Historical party names
Prior to 1976, conservative councillors stood on a variety of different platforms: the United Party, Nationalist Citizens Party, Civic Reform League, the Citizens' Municipal Organisation, the Liberal Civic Party and the Brisbane Civic Party.

The United Party and its successor the Nationalist Citizens Party were created as the vehicle for conservative candidates to campaign against Labor candidates in the newly formed Brisbane City Council. The Nationalist Citizens Party was doomed when the very conservative Civic Reform League was created on 12 December 1930. This saw most of the conservative councillors from the Nationalist Citizens Party - led by Acting Mayor Watson - defect to the Civic Reform League, which failed to win the subsequent elections. The Progress Party was created at the same time and for the 1931 election saw only three of its candidates win, including John Greene, who became Lord Mayor as a compromise candidate amongst the 20 alderman.

The Citizens' Municipal Organisation (CMO) was ostensibly a nonpartisan grouping, but was informally aligned with firstly the United Australian Party, then the Liberal Party (after 1944). The CMO was formed on 23 June 1936 and was the platform for the election campaigns of Sir John Chandler and Sir Reg Groom. Finally in the 1976 election, the Liberal Party began to contest the elections directly.

References

External links
 Brisbane's Lord Mayors

Brisbane
 
 
Mayors
History of Brisbane